Dress for Excess is the second album by British band Sigue Sigue Sputnik, released in December 1988 in Brazil and in April 1989 in the UK and US.

Release
The album was released in Brazil before anywhere else, to make way for the band's Brazilian tour. The first single released from the album was "Success" and was produced by Stock Aitken Waterman. It became the most successful single from the album, peaking at number 31 on the UK Singles Chart. The music video for the single featured a number of famous people saying the word "Success". "Dancerama" peaked at number 50 on the Singles Chart. The video was filmed in Paris and was based on the sci-fi film La Jetée.

The song, "Albinoni vs Star Wars" is a version of "Adagio in G Minor" (attributed to Tomaso Albinoni), which Tony James originally retitled "Tarzan vs. IBM". However, both brand names were copyrighted, so he changed the name to "Albinoni vs. Star Wars". The single peaked at number 75 in the UK. The final single, "Rio Rocks" was produced by Brazilian Liminha and was based on "La Bamba".

Reception
Reviewing the album for Record Mirror, David Giles wrote: "The Sputnik language is littered with buzz words – 'star wars', 'satellite', 'dance', 'sex', 'Rio', 'future'. These are intended to act as signifiers for the images that they wish to convey. 'Star Wars' is supposed to make you think of the space age, and the fact that the band are so terribly modern. 'Rio' conjures up the image of Latin America riots, thus lending the lyrics a 'current affairs' angle... but the Big One, SSS's raison d'être, is SEX. SEX SEX SEX, they should have called themselves. That's what it all boils down to, the idea that all women want their bodies".

Reviewing for Smash Hits, Carol Irving described the album as "such a mish mash of echoey spook noises that, far from being the future of rock 'n' roll, if you took all the blips and bleeps away, you'd be left with some terrible, old fashioned rock 'n' roll."

Billboard review: "Cover legend, "This Time It's Music," on SSS' second album is almost laughable; while silly hype that surrounded band's 1986 debut has dissipated (no commercial space for sale this time), music remains in short supply as well. Standard dance-pop stuff won't move anybody; even the S/A/W-produced single, "Success," is sub-Kylie Minogue material."

Track listing

Track 5, "Rio Rocks!", contains a sample of Tony Montana (Al Pacino) saying "Go ahead, Romeo" from the 1983 movie Scarface. The band Boom Boom Satellites named themselves after the second song on the album.

Personnel
Musicians
Martin Degville – vocals
Tony James – "space" guitar
Neal X – guitar
Miss Yana Ya Ya (Jane Farrimond) – keyboards, effects
Chris Kavanagh – drums
Ray Mayhew – drums
Bill Mitchell – "all deep vocals"
Sylvia Mason-James – backing vocals
Technical
Stephen Hague – producer (1)
Neal X – engineer, producer (1, 2, 4, 7–10)
Liminha – producer (3, 5)
Mike Stock – producer (6)
Matt Aitken – producer (6)
Pete Waterman – producer (6)
Gordon Bonner – mixing engineer (10)
Phil Harding – mixing (6)
Gary Langan – mixing (3, 5)
Stephen Taylor – mixing engineer (1, 2, 4, 7–9)
Ian Ross – art direction, design
Bill Smith – art direction, design
Tony James – marketing, design, photo concepts
Johnny Rozsa – photography

Charts

References

1988 albums
Sigue Sigue Sputnik albums
EMI Records albums
Albums produced by Stephen Hague
Albums produced by Stock Aitken Waterman